Lead City University is a private university in Ibadan, Oyo State, Nigeria.

History 
The university submitted its application to the National Universities Commission the year 2002. The Standing Committee on Private Universities (SCOPU) conducted the verification and the final assessment visits in August and September, 2003, respectively. At the end of the assessment visits, SCOPU reported that the profile of the Proprietor of Lead City University confirmed that it has the capacity and resources to establish a private university. Thereafter, the university was "approved for immediate take off" by the Board of NUC in December 2003 as a prelude to the ratification by the Federal Executive Council, which was effected on the 16th of February, 2005.

Though the charter of the university has City University, Ibadan as its name but due to several cases of mistaken identity and in order to avert corporate identity problem, the board of trustees and council of the university had an extraordinary meeting on the 7th of March, 2005, and resolved to modify the name to read Lead City University, Ibadan. The change in name was subsequently communicated to the Federal Ministry of Education, the National Universities Commission, Joint Admissions and Matriculation Board (JAMB) and other stakeholders while all previous documents relating to City University, Ibadan remain valid.

Notable faculty 
Tunji Olaopa, founder and Executive Vice-chairman ISGPP
Olufemi Onabajo, Vice Chancellor

Gallery

References

 
2005 establishments in Nigeria
Educational institutions established in 2005
Universities and colleges in Ibadan
Private universities and colleges in Nigeria